19th Expeditionary Sustainment Command is a Sustainment Command of the United States Army based wthin United States Army Garrison Daegu, South Korea.

The command works with the following units within South Korea:
 403rd Army Field Support Brigade
 837th Transportation Battalion
 Defense Contract Management Agency-Korea
 411th Contracting Support Brigade
 U.S. Army Medical Materiel Center – Korea
 Defense Logistics Agency (DLA) Energy
 DLA Distribution

References

Sustainment Commands of the United States Army